Sekondi Hasaacas Ladies F.C. is a Ghanaian professional women's football club based in Sekondi-Takoradi in the Western Region of Ghana. The club features in the Ghana Women’s Premier League. The club was formed as a women's club by Sekondi Hasaacas F.C. football management. It is currently the most successful women's club in Ghana after winning the Women's League on 4 different occasions.

History

Establishment 
Hasaacas Ladies Football Club was formed in June 2003, the club was formed as part of the Sekondi Hasaacas F.C. conglomerate of clubs. The idea to form the a women's club was brought up by women's football enthusiast and Sekondi Hasaacas fan Ben Hassan upon his return from Germany, he later pitched the idea to Benjamin Nanabayin Eyison and Alhaji Fuseini Mahama and the club was formed. After that the club played in games in the Western Region and invitational friendly tournaments internationally before the creation of the Ghana Women's Premier League.

Ghana Women's Premier League (2012–) 
On 8 April 2013, the club won the inaugural Ghana Women's Premier League in the 2012–13 season after defeating Fabulous Ladies by 2–1 in the Championship final. Their club captain Samira Suleman was adjudged as the best player of the inaugural season.  The 2013–14 season was as successful as the previous season, as Hasaacas won the Southern Zone League and qualified for the Championship final against Fabulous Ladies winners of the Northern Zone, making it the second successive year the two teams were meeting in a championship final. Hasaacas Ladies defeated Fabulous Ladies via a 5–3 penalty shootout after the match had ended in a goalless draw after extra time to clinch the title for the second time in the club's history. Ghanaian International defender Janet Egyir was adjudged the player of the season. The club is set to represent Ghana at the maiden CAF Women's Champions League scheduled June 2021.

Grounds 

The club trains at the Hasaacas Park also known as the Chapel Hill Park in Sekondi-Takoradi. They occasionally train at the Effiakuma police park. The Essipong Stadium and Essipong Stadium Annex have served as home venue for their fixtures over a period of years, however the club currently plays their home matches at Gyandu Park in Sekondi-Takoradi.

Support 
The club is the women's club affiliate of male team Sekondi Hasaacas F.C. who won the Ghana Premier League in 1977.

Honours

Domestic
Leagues
Ghana Women's Premier League 
 Winners (record) (4): 2012–13, 2013–14, 2014–15, 2020–21

Ghana Women's Special Competition
 Winners (1): 2019
Cups
Ghana Women's FA Cup
 Winners (1): 2021

African

 CAF Women's Champions League WAFU Zone B Qualifiers

 Winners (1): 2021
CAF Women's Champions League
 Runners-up (1): 2021

Doubles and Trebles 

Trebles
 Premier League, FA Cup, WAFU Zone B: 2020–21

Notable players 
For details on notable Hasaacas Ladies F.C. footballers see Category:Hasaacas Ladies F.C. players.

See also 

 Women's football in Ghana
 Sekondi Hasaacas F.C.
Ampem Darkoa Ladies F.C.

References

External links 

 Official Website
 Hasaacas Ladies on Twitter
Footy Ghana category about Sekondi Hasaacas Ladies

2003 establishments in Ghana
Association football clubs established in 2003
Women's football clubs in Ghana